Mattia Rossetti (born 16 June 1996) is an Italian footballer who plays as a forward for  club Rimini.

Career
He made his Serie B debut for Catania on 24 December 2014 in a game against Cittadella.

On 13 December 2019 he joined Serie D club ACR Messina.

On 13 February 2021, Rosetti joined to Campobasso.

On 6 July 2022, Rossetti signed a two-year contract with Piacenza. 

On 4 January 2023, Rossetti moved to Rimini on a 1.5-year contract.

References

External links
 
 

1996 births
Living people
Sportspeople from the Province of Avellino
Footballers from Campania
Italian footballers
Association football forwards
Serie B players
Serie C players
Serie D players
Catania S.S.D. players
S.S. Racing Club Roma players
U.S. Vibonese Calcio players
A.S.D. Sicula Leonzio players
A.C.R. Messina players
S.S.D. Acireale Calcio 1946 players
S.S.D. Città di Campobasso players
Piacenza Calcio 1919 players
Rimini F.C. 1912 players